John DeWitt Warner (October 30, 1851 – May 27, 1925) served as a U.S. Representative for parts of Manhattan, including Midtown, Hell's Kitchen, and Chelsea, from 1891–95.

Early life and education
Born on a farm near Reading, New York, Warner moved with his parents to Big Stream (later Glenora), New York, and later to Rock Stream, New York.  He completed preparatory studies and attended the district schools and Starkey Seminary, Eddytown, New York.  Warner graduated from Cornell University in 1872 and from Albany Law School in 1876.

Prior to attending law school, Warner taught at the Ithaca and Albany Academies for four years.  Upon graduation, he began practicing law in New York City. He was elected as an Alumni Trustee of Cornell in June 1882. Warner was president of the American Free Trade League from 1905–1909, and served as special counsel for the dock department advising on terminal work in 1911 and 1912.  He served on a commission to revise the New York banking laws in 1913.

Warner was a charter member of Cornell's chapter of Delta Kappa Epsilon and a member of the Irving Literary Society.  He wrote the lyrics for the Cornell song 1875. He was one of the founders of the National Sculpture Society and served president of the Art Commission of the City of New York.

Marriage and family

He married Lillian Hudson, a native of New York. She descended from an old New York family. Her paternal grandfather served with distinction in the War of 1812. She graduated at the Ithaca Academy and then attended Cornell University. Hudson first met Warner when she was fourteen years of age, and a student in the Ithaca Academy where he was Professor of Languages. While instructing his beautiful young pupil in the dead languages he improved this opportunity to teach her the potent living language of love, so well that after leaving Cornell University she became his wife. They had two children, a son and a daughter, Charlot Lillian Warner.

References

External links
Fogle, Jr., Homer William (3 Jul 2006). "DX of DKE Special Study #09: John DeWitt Warner '72"
 Infoplease Biography
 

Cornell University alumni
Albany Law School alumni
1851 births
1925 deaths
Delta Kappa Epsilon
Democratic Party members of the United States House of Representatives from New York (state)